Robert Fulton (born June 2, 1982) is a former American soccer player who played only one match for Seattle Sounders in 2005.

References

External links
 Stanford University bio

1982 births
Living people
Soccer players from Oregon
Stanford Cardinal men's soccer players
San Jose Earthquakes players
Seattle Sounders (1994–2008) players
USL First Division players
People from West Linn, Oregon
American soccer players
San Jose Earthquakes draft picks
Sportspeople from the Portland metropolitan area
Association football goalkeepers